Exosoma is a genus of skeletonizing leaf beetles belonging to the family Chrysomelidae, subfamily Galerucinae.

Species
Species within this genus include:

 Exosoma abyssiniacum Weise, 1907
 Exosoma albanicum (Meschnigg, 1934)
 Exosoma albanicum Meschnigg, 1934
 Exosoma alluaudi Laboissiere, 1919
 Exosoma alternatum Laboissiere, 1931
 Exosoma angolense Laboissiere, 1939
 Exosoma apicale Laboissiere, 1919
 Exosoma apicipenne (Jacoby, 1899)
 Exosoma barkeri Jacoby, 1903
 Exosoma basimarginatum (Jacoby, 1895)
 Exosoma bayoni (Laboissiere, 1937)
 Exosoma bicolor (Allard, 1889)
 Exosoma capitatum (Jacoby, 1897)
 Exosoma clypeatum (Jacoby, 1895)
 Exosoma collare (Hummel, 1825)
 Exosoma collare Hummel, 1825
 Exosoma congoanum (Weise, 1915)
 Exosoma convexiusculum Bechyne, 1954
 Exosoma costatum Kimoto, 1996
 Exosoma dalmani (Jacoby, 1897)
 Exosoma dilatatum (Jacoby, 1894)
 Exosoma discoidale (Jacoby, 1895)
 Exosoma donckieri (Jacoby, 1897)
 Exosoma fairmairei (Jacoby, 1895)
 Exosoma femorale Laboissiere, 1937
 Exosoma flavicorne (Jacoby, 1892)
 Exosoma fulvonigrum Laboissiere, 1938
 Exosoma gaudioni (Reiche, 1862)
 Exosoma gaudionis Reiche, 1862
 Exosoma geniculatum Laboissiere, 1910
 Exosoma gerstaeckeri (Jacoby, 1899)
 Exosoma ghesquierei Laboissiere, 1940
 Exosoma gracilicorne (Weise, 1895)
 Exosoma illota (Boheman, 1895)
 Exosoma indecorum (Weise, 1927)
 Exosoma insulare Laboissiere, 1937
 Exosoma keniense Laboissiere, 1919
 Exosoma kibonotense Weise, 1909
 Exosoma kohlschutteri (Weise, 1903)
 Exosoma lebrunae Laboissiere, 1940
 Exosoma lundana Laboissiere, 1939
 Exosoma lusitanicum (Linnaeus, 1767)
 Exosoma luteum Laboissiere, 1932
 Exosoma maculicolle Weise, 1907
 Exosoma marginellum Bechyne, 1954
 Exosoma melanocephalum (Jacoby, 1899)
 Exosoma meroudi Laboissiere, 1939
 Exosoma meruense Weise, 1909
 Exosoma monticola Weise, 1909
 Exosoma neglecta Mohr, 1968
 Exosoma nigricolle (Jacoby, 1892)
 Exosoma nigricorne (Weise, 1902)
 Exosoma nigritulum (Chapuis, 1879)
 Exosoma nigriventre (Quedenfeldt, 1888)
 Exosoma nigrocephalum Laboissiere, 1939
 Exosoma nigrofulvum Laboissiere, 1939
 Exosoma nigrum (Allard, 1889)
 Exosoma nodieri Laboissiere, 1923
 Exosoma opaculum (Fairmaire, 1902)
 Exosoma ornatum Laboissiere, 1940
 Exosoma pallidum (Jacoby, 1897)
 Exosoma pallidum Laboissiere, 1931
 Exosoma parvulum (Jacoby, 1884)
 Exosoma pectorale Weise, 1914
 Exosoma persimplex Weise, 1909
 Exosoma pseudoakkoae Medvedev, 1998
 Exosoma pubescens (Weise, 1927)
 Exosoma quadimaculatum (Jacoby, 1882)
 Exosoma rudepunctatum (Allard, 1889)
 Exosoma seabrai Laboissiere, 1939
 Exosoma sheppardi Jacoby, 1906
 Exosoma speciosum Weise, 1907
 Exosoma straminipenne (Weise, 1907)
 Exosoma sturmi Jacoby, 1906
 Exosoma suturale (Jacoby, 1895)
 Exosoma testaceum (Olivier, 1791)
 Exosoma theryi (Guillebeau, 1897)
 Exosoma thoracicum (Redtenbacher, 1843)
 Exosoma tibiale (Jacoby, 1898)
 Exosoma tibiellum Bechyne, 1954
 Exosoma tomokunii Takizawa, 1990
 Exosoma tomokunii Takizawa, 1990
 Exosoma tongaatense Jacoby, 1906
 Exosoma transvaalense (Jacoby, 1898)
 Exosoma unicolor (Jacoby, 1894)
 Exosoma unipunctatum (Harold, 1880)
 Exosoma variipe (Jacoby, 1900)
 Exosoma ventrale (Weise, 1902)
 Exosoma viridipenne (Chapuis, 1880)
 Exosoma vittatum Laboissiere, 1939
 Exosoma wittei Laboissiere, 1940

References 

Galerucinae
Chrysomelidae genera
Taxa named by Martin Jacoby